Beckham most commonly refers to:

 Beckham (surname), a surname (and list of people with that name)
David Beckham (born 1975), English former professional footballer
Odell Beckham Jr. (born 1992), American football player

Beckham may also refer to:

Places
Beckham, Virginia, US, an unincorporated community
East Beckham, Norfolk, England
West Beckham, Norfolk, England
Beckham County, Kentucky, US
Beckham County, Oklahoma, US

Other
Bend It Like Beckham, a British sports comedy film
Beckham rule, a rule in Major League Soccer in the United States and Canada, allowing each team to sign one player outside of the league's salary cap

See also
Beckingham Palace (Rowneybury House), a play on Victoria and David Beckham's name
Posh and Becks, a widely used nickname for Victoria and David Beckham
Bechem (disambiguation)